Ingrid D. Rowland (b. August 19, 1953) is a professor at the University of Notre Dame School of Architecture. She is a frequent contributor to The New York Review of Books.

Biography
She is the daughter of Nobel Chemistry Prize laureate Frank Sherwood Rowland.

Rowland completed her Bachelor of Arts degree in classics at Pomona College in 1974 and earned her Master's and Ph.D. degrees in Greek literature and classical archaeology at Bryn Mawr College.

Based in Rome, Rowland writes about Italian art, architecture, history and many other topics for The New York Review of Books.

Publications
The Culture of the High Renaissance: Ancients and Moderns in Sixteenth Century Rome (1998)
The Place of the Antique in Early Modern Europe (1999)
The Scarith of Scornello: a Tale of Renaissance Forgery (2004) based on the "Etruscan" forgeries of Curzio Inghirami
The Roman Garden of Agostino Chigi (2005)
From Heaven to Arcadia: The Sacred and the Profane in the Renaissance (2005)
Giordano Bruno: Philosopher/Heretic (2008)
From Pompeii: The Afterlife of a Roman Town (2014)
The Divine Spark of Syracuse (2019)

Awards and honors
 Grace Dudley Prize for Arts Writing, Robert B. Silvers Foundation, 2021
Socio Corrispondente, Accademia dei Sepolti, Volterra, Italy, 2005
 Founding Member, Academia Bibliotecae Alexandrinae (Egypt), 2004
 Elected Member, American Academy of Arts and Sciences, 2002
 Fellow, Getty Research Institute, 2000–2001
 John Simon Guggenheim Foundation Fellowship, 2000–2001

References

1953 births
American classical scholars
Women classical scholars
Bryn Mawr College alumni
Living people
Pomona College alumni
University of Notre Dame faculty
Fellows of the American Academy of Arts and Sciences